Tiritiri Matangi Lighthouse, also known as Tiritiri Lighthouse, is a lighthouse on Tiritiri Matangi, an island in the Hauraki Gulf 28 km north of Auckland in the North Island of New Zealand. It is owned and operated by Maritime New Zealand. It is considered the best-preserved lighthouse complex in the country, and is the oldest lighthouse in New Zealand still in operation. It was once the most powerful lighthouse in the Southern Hemisphere.

History 
Constructed in 1864 from cast iron, the light was first lit on 1 January 1865. The light was first automated in 1925 and used an acetylene burning revolving light. Keepers returned to the light in 1947 and it remained staffed until 1984 when the light was fully automated. The light's last keeper, Ray Walter, remained on the island working with his wife Barbara as Department of Conservation rangers until their retirement in 2006.

The lighthouse along with the nearby visitor centre is a popular destination, although the light itself is not open to the public. The building has a Category I listing with Heritage New Zealand.

See also 

 List of lighthouses in New Zealand

References

External links 

 
 Lighthouses of New Zealand, Maritime New Zealand

Lighthouses in New Zealand
Heritage New Zealand Category 1 historic places in the Auckland Region
Tourist attractions in the Auckland Region
1860s architecture in New Zealand
1865 establishments in New Zealand
Transport buildings and structures in the Auckland Region